The 1997 Warrington Wolves season was the 103rd season in the club's rugby league history and the second season in the Super League. Coached by Darryl van der Velde, the Warrington Wolves competed in Super League II and finished in 9th place. The club also reached the quarter final of the Challenge Cup.

Table

Squad

References

External links
Warrington Wolves - Rugby League Project

Warrington Wolves
Warrington Wolves seasons